CRISP may refer to:

 Center for Research in Security and Privacy, largest research center for IT security in Europe
 C-language Reduced Instruction Set Processor, an AT&T microprocessor design
 Chesapeake Regional Information System for our Patients, a  health information exchange in Maryland, US
 Computer Registration Involving Student Participation, online course registration system designed by Bernard Galler
 Computer Retrieval of Information on Scientific Projects, a database of biomedical research projects funded by the U.S. government
 Construction Research and Innovation Strategy Panel, a construction industry study group in the United Kingdom
 Coral Reef Initiative for the South Pacific, a French inter-ministerial project founded in 2002
 Cross-industry standard process for data mining (CRISP-DM), a data mining process model
 Cross Registry Information Service Protocol, an Internet standard for looking up information on domain names and network numbers
 Cysteine-rich secretory protein (CRISPs), a family of proteins important to mammalian reproduction and also found in various snake venoms

See also
 Crisp (disambiguation)